Frederick Douglass is a 2013 bronze sculpture depicting the American abolitionist and politician of the same name by Steven Weitzman, installed in the United States Capitol Visitor Center's Emancipation Hall, in Washington, D.C.

See also

 2013 in art
 List of artworks commemorating African Americans in Washington, D.C.

References

External links
 

2013 establishments in Washington, D.C.
2013 sculptures
Bronze sculptures in Washington, D.C.
Cultural depictions of Frederick Douglass
Monuments and memorials in Washington, D.C.
Douglass
Douglass
Douglass
Douglass
Douglass
United States Capitol statues